The men's 60 metres hurdles at the 2022 World Athletics Indoor Championships took place on 20 March 2022.

Results

Heats
Qualification: First 3 in each heat (Q) and the next 6 fastest (q) advance to the Semi-Finals

The heats were started at 10:05.

Semifinals
Qualification: First 2 in each heat (Q) and the next 2 fastest (q) advance to the Final

The heats were started at 17:05.

King and Nomoto were tied and King advanced after his name was drawn from a bag.

Final
The final was started at 19:25.

References

60 metres hurdles
60 metres hurdles at the World Athletics Indoor Championships